Olbrycht Karmanowski (born circa 1580, died after 1632) was a Polish nobleman, member of Polish Brethren Church, courtier, poet and translator. He is regarded as one of the minor poets of Polish late Renaissance and Baroque.

Biography
Olbrycht Karmanowski was born into a family of noblemen.  Information about his life is scanty. His coat of arms was Prus I. He was well educated, probably in schools at Raków and Lubartów. He also studied abroad.  He took part in the Zebrzydowski Rebellion in 1607.  Later he became a courtier of a powerful magnate, Lithuanian duke Krzysztof Radziwiłł the younger (1585-1640). Among others he was a supervisor of Radziwiłł's real estates.

Works
Olbrycht Karmanowski is the author of several poems that are preserved to this day. Among his works is the cycle Pieśni pokutne (Penitential Hymns). His well-known poem is Olbrycht Karmanowski Piotrowi Kochanowskiemu, autorowi przełożenia "Gofreda" (Olbrycht Karmanowski to Piotr Kochanowski, the translator of the Jerusalem Delivered 1618). Karmanowski's Pieśń 13. W chorobie (Canto 13. In an Illness) is especially interesting as an early example of enneasyllable with the caesura after the fifth syllable. This metre, introduced into Polish Renaissance verse by Jan Kochanowski but not much used before the 19th century, is extremely popular today. He used Sapphic stanzas in the poem O śmierci (On Death), too. Karmanowski was also a translator of verse, including poems by Anacreon and Ovid.

Criticism
 Janusz Ziembiński, Twórczość poetycka Olbrychta Karmanowskiego [Olbrycht Karmanowski's literary work], Uniwersytet Ślaski w Katowicach, Katowice 2010.

References

Bibliography
 Olbrycht Karmanowski, Wiersze i listy [Poems and letters], Wydał [edited by] Radosław Grześkowiak, Instytut Badań Literackich and Pro Cultura Litteraria, Warszawa 2010.

External links
 Olbrycht Karmanowski's three poems at Staropolska.pl (in Polish) 
 Olbrycht Karmanowski's poems (in Polish)

16th-century births
17th-century deaths
Polish Calvinist and Reformed Christians
Polish poets